Ermis Kiveri F.C. is a Greek football club, based in Kiveri, Argolis.

The original ground of the team is Lerna's Field but, it having only 100 seats, they moved for this season to the bigger stadium of Argos.

Honors

Domestic Titles and honors
 Argolis FCA Championship: 2
  2013–14, 2016–17
 Argolis FCA Cup: 1 
 2013–14

External links

Argolis
Sports clubs in Peloponnese (region)